Joghanab or Jaghnab or Jeghanab or Jaghanab may refer to:
 Joghanab, Ardabil
 Jeghanab, East Azerbaijan
 Joghanab-e Olya, East Azerbaijan Province
 Joghanab-e Sofla, East Azerbaijan Province